Mihai Macovei (born 29 October 1986) is a Romanian rugby union player. He plays in the flanker and occasionally number 8 position for French Pro D2 club Colomiers. Macovei also plays for Romania's national team the Oaks.

He represented Romania in the 2011 Rugby World Cup, and, following the retirement of Marius Tincu, was named captain for the 2015 tournament and has of 2022 captained the Oaks 68 times. He went on to be Romania's star performer in the pool stages, scoring two tries in the Oaks' dramatic comeback victory against Canada. 

In 2023 Macovei became the fifth Romanian test centurion, earning his 100th international appearance in the defeat against Samoa in the 2022 autumn internationals.

References

External links

 
 
 
 Mihai Macovei at US Colomiers

1986 births
Living people
People from Gura Humorului
Romanian rugby union players
Romania international rugby union players
US Colomiers players
Rugby union locks
Rugby union flankers